is a Quasi-National Park that extends in the Ōu Mountains between Miyagi and Yamagata Prefectures, Japan. Established in 1963, the central feature of the park is Mount Zaō. It is rated a protected landscape (Category V) according to the IUCN.

Like all quasi-national parks in Japan, the park is managed by the local prefectural governments, in this case, that of Yamagata and Miyagi prefectures.

Related municipalities
 Miyagi: Kawasaki, Sendai, Shichikashuku, Shiroishi, Zaō
 Yamagata: Kaminoyama, Yamagata

See also
 National Parks of Japan

References
Sutherland, Mary and Britton, Dorothy. The National Parks of Japan. Kodansha International (1995).

External links
 
  Map of Zaō Quasi-National Park

Zaō, Miyagi

National parks of Japan
Parks and gardens in Miyagi Prefecture
Parks and gardens in Yamagata Prefecture
Protected areas established in 1963
1963 establishments in Japan
Kawasaki, Miyagi
Sendai
Shichikashuku, Miyagi
Shiroishi, Miyagi